Ketty Gabriele (born 10 July 1981 in Naples) is a reputed Camorra figure. Gabriele, a femminiello and member of the Camorra, was reported as the first transgender mafia figure following an arrest by Naples police in February 2009. According to authorities, Gabriele is a small-time capo behind a drug and prostitution ring for the Scissionisti di Secondigliano.

She pushed large quantities of drugs for Camorra boss Paolo Di Lauro, but since Di Lauro's arrest and the so-called Scampia feud between Camorra gangs, she did not need to answer to anyone anymore. Her elder brother, Salvatore Gabriele, is one of the Camorristi that graduated to become a boss. He wanted to extend his activities traveling the up and down Italy, supplying large- and small-scale dealers, and left her to run things at Scampia.

Gabriele fits in an old and long tradition of gay or femminiello (effeminate) culture in Naples. Generally femminielli are considered good luck, for instance in gambling.

References

1981 births
Living people
Italian transgender people
Scissionisti di Secondigliano
Transgender women